[[File:Lebedev baptism.jpg|350px|thumb|The Baptism of Rus (Klavdiy Lebedev  1900)]]

The Christianization of Kievan Rus' was a long and complicated process that took place in several stages. In 867, Patriarch Photius of Constantinople told other Christian patriarchs that the Rus' people were converting enthusiastically, but his efforts seem to have entailed no lasting consequences, since the Primary Chronicle and other Slavonic sources describe the tenth-century Rus' as still firmly entrenched in Slavic paganism. The traditional view, as recorded in the Primary Chronicle, is that the definitive Christianization of Kievan Rus' dates happened  988 (the year is disputed), when Vladimir/Volodymyr the Great was baptized in Chersonesus (Korsun) and proceeded to baptize his family and people in Kiev. The latter events are traditionally referred to as baptism of Rus' ''' in Ukrainian and Russian literature.

 Antiquity 
Although sometimes solely attributed to Vladimir/Volodymyr, the Christianisation of Kievan Rus' was a long and complicated process that began before the state's formation. As early as the 1st century CE, Greeks in the Black Sea Colonies converted to Christianity, although most of these lands never became part of Kyivan Rus'. The Primary Chronicle records the legend of Andrew the Apostle's mission to these coastal settlements, as well as blessing the site of present-day Kyiv. Andrew supposedly visited Chersonesus Taurica in Crimea, where he converted several thousand men to the new faith, and on his way north along the Dnipro reached the future locations of Kyiv and Veliky Novgorod. The legendary account in the Primary Chronicle tells that Andrew was amused by the Slavic customs of washing in a hot steam bath, banya, on his way. The Goths migrated to through the region in the 3rd century, adopting Arian Christianity in the 4th century, leaving behind 4th- and 5th-century churches excavated in Crimea (which was outside of Kyivan control, except for Tmutarakan), although the Hunnic invasion of the 370s halted Christianisation for several centuries.

 Ninth century 
Some of the earliest Kyivan princes and princesses such as Askold and Dir and Olha of Kyiv reportedly converted to Christianity, but Oleh the Wise, Ihor of Kyiv and Svyatoslav remained pagans. According to some sources and historians, there was an attempt in the 9th century to Christianise Kyivan Rus'. The most authoritative source for this purported first conversion attempt is an encyclical letter of Patriarch Photius of Constantinople, datable to early 867. Referencing the Rus'-Byzantine War of 860, Photius informs the Oriental patriarchs and bishops that, after the Bulgarians turned to Christ in 864, the Rus' followed suit so zealously that he found it prudent to send to their land a bishop.

Byzantine historians, starting with the continuation of Theophanes the Confessor, assumed that the Rus' raid against Constantinople in 860 was a Byzantine success and attributed the presumed victory to the Intercession of the Theotokos. This conviction dictated the following interpretation: awed by the miracles they witnessed under the walls of the imperial capital and grief-stricken at the disaster that befell them, the Rus' sent envoys to Photius and asked him to send a bishop to their land.

According to Constantine VII, who authored a biography of his grandfather, Basil the Macedonian, it was his ancestor who persuaded the Rus' to abandon their pagan ways. Constantine attributes the conversion to Basil and to Patriarch Ignatius, rather than to their predecessors, Michael III and Photius. He narrates how the Byzantines galvanized the Rus' into conversion by their persuasive words and rich presents, including gold, silver, and precious tissues. He also repeats a traditional story that the pagans were particularly impressed by a miracle: a gospel book thrown by the archbishop (sic) into an oven was not damaged by fire.

Constantine's account precipitated a long-term dispute over whether the 9th-century Christianization of the Rus' went through two stages. One school of thought postulates that there was only one Christianization: wishing to glorify his ancestor, Constantine simply ascribed to Basil the missionary triumphs of his predecessor, Michael III.

On the other hand, Constantine Zuckerman argues that, in response to the initial request of the Rus', Photius (and Michael III) sent to the Rus' Khaganate a simple bishop. The pagans felt slighted at the low rank of the prelate and their Christian zeal evaporated. In September 867, Michael was assassinated by Basil, who (together with a new patriarch, Ignatius) sent to the Rus' an archbishop who propped up the religious fervor of the local leaders with rich presents. Parenthetically, the contemporaneous Christianization of Bulgaria was likewise effected in two stages: the Bulgars were offended when a simple bishop arrived to their capital from Constantinople and requested Pope Nicholas I to send them a higher-ranking church official. Such considerations were an important matter of political prestige. This pattern has parallels with the stories of Frankish historians about the multiple "baptisms" of the Norsemen, whose true intention was to get hold of the rich gifts accompanying the Christianization rituals.

The date and rationale for the Christianization are also shrouded in controversy. Grigory Litavrin views the event as "a formal and diplomatic act making it easier to obtain advantageous agreements with the ruler of the Christian state." Zuckerman argues that Ignatius sent his archbishop to Rus' in about 870, while Dmitry Obolensky inclines to accept 874 as the date of the definitive Christianization.

 Tenth century 

Whatever the scope of Photius's efforts to Christianize the Rus', their effect was not lasting. Although they fail to mention the mission of Photius, the authors of the Primary Chronicle were aware that a sizable portion of the Kievan population was Christian by 944. In the Russo-Byzantine Treaty, preserved in the text of the chronicle, the Christian part of the Rus' swear according to their faith, while the ruling prince and other non-Christians invoke Perun and Veles after the pagan custom. The Kievan collegiate church of St. Elijah (whose cult in the Slavic countries was closely modeled on that of Perun) is mentioned in the text of the chronicle, leaving modern scholars to ponder how many churches existed in Kiev at the time.

Either in 945 or 957, the ruling regent, Olga of Kiev, visited Constantinople with a certain priest, Gregory. Her reception at the imperial court is described in De Ceremoniis. According to legends, Byzantine Emperor Constantine VII fell in love with Olga; however, she found a way to refuse him by tricking him to become her godfather. When she was baptized, she said it was inappropriate for a godfather to marry his goddaughter.

Although it is usually presumed that Olga was baptized in Constantinople rather than Kiev, there is no explicit mention of the sacrament, so neither version is excluded. Olga is also known to have requested a bishop and priests from Rome. Her son, Sviatoslav (r. 963–972), continued to worship Perun and other gods of the Slavic pantheon. He remained a stubborn pagan all of his life; according to the Primary Chronicle, he believed that his warriors would lose respect for him and mock him if he became a Christian.

Sviatoslav's successor, Yaropolk I (r. 972–980), seems to have had a more conciliatory attitude towards Christianity. Late medieval sources even claim that Yaropolk exchanged ambassadors with the Pope. The Chronicon of Adémar de Chabannes and the life of St. Romuald (by Pietro Damiani) actually document the mission of St. Bruno of Querfurt to the land of Rus', where he succeeded in converting to Christianity a local king (one of three brothers who ruled the land). Alexander Nazarenko suggests that Yaropolk went through some preliminary rites of baptism, but was murdered at the behest of his pagan half-brother Vladimir (whose own rights to the throne were questionable) before his conversion was formalized. Following this theory, any information on Yaropolk's baptism according to the Latin rite would be suppressed by the later Orthodox chroniclers, zealous to keep Vladimir's image of the Rus Apostle untarnished for succeeding generations.

 Vladimir's baptism of Kiev 

 Background 

During the first decade of Vladimir's reign, pagan reaction set in. Perun was chosen as the supreme deity of the Slavic pantheon and his idol was placed on the hill by the royal palace. This revival of paganism was contemporaneous with similar attempts undertaken by Jarl Haakon in Norway and (possibly) Svein Forkbeard in Denmark. His religious reform failed. By the late 980s, he had found it necessary to adopt monotheism from abroad.

The Primary Chronicle reports that, in the year 986, Vladimir met with representatives from several religions. The result is amusingly described in the following apocryphal anecdote. Upon the meeting with Muslim Bulgarians of the Volga, Vladimir found their religion unsuitable due to its requirement to circumcise and taboos against alcoholic beverages and pork; supposedly, Vladimir said on that occasion: "Drinking is the joy of the Rus." He also consulted with Jewish envoys (who may or may not have been Khazars), questioned them about Judaism but ultimately rejected it, saying that their loss of Jerusalem was evidence of their having been abandoned by God.

In the year 987, as the result of a consultation with his boyars, Vladimir sent envoys to study the religions of the various neighboring nations whose representatives had been urging him to embrace their respective faiths. Of the Muslim Bulgarians of the Volga the envoys reported there is no joy among them; only sorrow and a great stench. In the gloomy churches of the Germans his emissaries saw no beauty; but at Hagia Sophia, where the full festival ritual of the Byzantine Church was set in motion to impress them, they found their ideal: "We no longer knew whether we were in heaven or on earth," they reported, "nor such beauty, and we know not how to tell of it." Baptism of Vladimir 

Foreign sources, very few in number, present the following story of Vladimir's conversion. Yahya of Antioch and his followers (al-Rudhrawari, al-Makin, Al-Dimashqi, and ibn al-Athir) give essentially the same account. In 987, the generals Bardas Sclerus and Bardas Phocas revolted against the Byzantine emperor Basil II. Both rebels briefly joined forces and advanced on Constantinople. On September 14, 987, Bardas Phocas proclaimed himself emperor. Anxious to avoid the siege of his capital, Basil II turned to the Rus' for assistance, even though they were considered enemies at that time. Vladimir agreed, in exchange for a marital tie; he also agreed to accept Christianity as his religion and bring his people to the new faith. When the wedding arrangements were settled, Vladimir dispatched 6,000 troops to the Byzantine Empire and they helped to put down the revolt.

In the Primary Chronicle, the account of Vladimir's baptism is preceded by the so-called Korsun' Legend. According to this apocryphal story, in 988 Vladimir captured the Greek town of Korsun' (Chersonesus) in Crimea, highly important commercially and politically. This campaign may have been dictated by his wish to secure the benefits promised to him by Basil II, when he had asked for the Rus' assistance against Phocas. In recompense for the evacuation of Chersonesos, Vladimir was promised the hand of the emperor's sister, Anna Porphyrogenita. Prior to the wedding, Vladimir was baptized (either in Chersonesos or in Kiev), taking the Christian name of Basil out of compliment to his imperial brother-in-law. The sacrament was followed by his marriage with the Byzantine princess. The alleged place of Vladimir's baptism in Chersonesos is marked by St. Vladimir's Cathedral.

 Baptism of Kiev 

Returning to Kiev in triumph, Vladimir exhorted the residents of his capital to the Dnieper river for baptism. This mass baptism became the iconic inaugural event in the Christianization of the state of Kievan Rus'.

At first, Vladimir baptized his twelve sons and many boyars. He destroyed the wooden statues of Slavic pagan gods (which he had himself raised just eight years earlier).  They were either burnt or hacked into pieces, and the statue of Perun — the supreme god — was thrown into the Dnieper.

Then Vladimir sent a message to all residents of Kiev, "rich, and poor, and beggars, and slaves", to come to the river on the following day, lest they risk becoming the "prince's enemies". Large numbers of people came; some even brought infants with them. They were sent into the water while priests, who came from Chersonesos for the occasion, prayed.

To commemorate the event, Vladimir built the first stone church of Kievan Rus', called the Church of the Tithes, where his body and the body of his new wife were to repose. Another church was built on top of the hill where pagan statues stood before.

 Aftermath 

The baptism of Kiev was followed by similar ceremonies in other urban centres of the country. The Ioakim Chronicle says that Vladimir's uncle, Dobrynya, forced the Novgorodians into Christianity "by fire", while the local mayor, Putyata, persuaded his compatriots to accept Christian faith "by the sword". At that same time, Bishop Ioakim Korsunianin built the first, wooden, Cathedral of Holy Wisdom "with 13 tops" on the site of a pagan cemetery.

Paganism persisted in the country for a long time, surfacing during the Upper Volga Uprising and other occasional pagan protests. The northeastern part of the country, centred on Rostov, was particularly hostile to the new religion.  Novgorod itself faced a pagan uprising as late as 1071, in which Bishop Fedor faced a real threat to his person; Prince Gleb Sviatoslavich broke up the crowd by chopping a sorcerer in half with an axe.

The Christianization of Rus firmly allied it with the Byzantine Empire. The Greek learning and book culture was adopted in Kiev and other centres of the country. Churches started to be built on the Byzantine model. During the reign of Vladimir's son Yaroslav I, Metropolitan Ilarion authored the first known work of East Slavic literature, an elaborate oration in which he favourably compared Rus to other lands known as the "Sermon on Law and Grace". The Ostromir Gospels, produced in Novgorod during the same period, was the first dated East Slavic book fully preserved. But the only surviving work of lay literature, The Tale of Igor's Campaign'', indicates that a degree of pagan worldview remained under Christian Kievan Rus'.

In 1988, the faithful of the Eastern Catholic and Orthodox churches which have roots in the baptism of Kyiv celebrated a millennium of Eastern Slavic Christianity. The great celebrations in Moscow changed the character of relationship between the Soviet state and the church. For the first time since 1917, numerous churches and monasteries were returned to the Russian Orthodox Church. In Ukrainian communities around the world, members of various Ukrainian churches also celebrated the Millennium of Christianity in Ukraine.

In 2008 the National Bank of Ukraine issued into circulation commemorative coins "Christianization of Kievan Rus" within "Rebirth of the Christian Spirituality in Ukraine" series.

In 2022, the traditional date of the holiday was granted the status of state public holiday in Ukraine under the title of Statehood Day.

Gallery

See also 
 Chersonesus Cathedral
 Christianization of Poland
 Christianity in the 10th century
 Theodore the Varangian and his son John
 Statehood Day (Ukraine)

References

Bibliography 
 

Christianization of Europe
10th century in Kievan Rus'
10th-century Christianity
860s in the Byzantine Empire
867
988
Metropolis of Kiev and all Rus'
Kievan Rus culture